An election for President of Israel was held in the Knesset on 31 July 2000, following Ezer Weizman's resignation.

History
Moshe Katsav, a Likud politician, ran against Shimon Peres, a previous Prime Minister of Israel. In a surprising upset, the Knesset elected Katsav, by 63 to 57. Katsav assumed office as President of Israel on 1 August 2000. He was the first Israeli president sworn in for a seven-year term, as well as the first candidate from the right-wing Likud party to be elected to the office.

Results

References

President
Presidential elections in Israel
Israel
Shimon Peres